Adam Schriemer (born August 17, 1995) is a Canadian male volleyball player. He is a member of the Canada men's national volleyball team and German club SVG Lüneburg. He currently serves as the head coach of Trinity Western University men's volleyball team.

Career

Club
Adam played post-secondary volleyball at Trinity Western University. During his time there he led the Spartans to four straight national U Sports championships between 2014 and 2018, winning in 2016 and 2017. Following his post-secondary career, he signed with German club SVG Lüneburg.

National Team
Adam joined the senior Canadian national team in 2019, playing in the Nations League.

Sporting Achievements

Club
 2014/2015  CIS Men's Volleyball Championship, with Trinity Western Spartans
 2015/2016  CIS Men's Volleyball Championship, with Trinity Western Spartans
 2016/2017  CIS Men's Volleyball Championship, with Trinity Western Spartans
 2017/2018  CIS Men's Volleyball Championship, with Trinity Western Spartans

References

1995 births
Living people
Canadian men's volleyball players
Volleyball players from Winnipeg